Pharasmanes or Parsman may refer to:

People
Pharasmanes I of Iberia, Georgian king
Pharasmanes II of Iberia, Georgian king
Pharasmanes III of Iberia, Georgian king
Pharasmanes IV of Iberia, Georgian king
Pharasmanes V of Iberia, Georgian king
Pharasmanes VI of Iberia, Georgian king

Places
Parsman, Iran, a village in Markazi Province, Iran